Scylacosauridae is an extinct family of therocephalian therapsids. Scylacosaurids lived during the Permian period and were among the most basal therocephalians. The family was named by South African paleontologist Robert Broom in 1903. Scylacosaurids have long snouts and unusual saber-like canine teeth.

References

External links
 Scylacosauridae in the Paleobiology Database

 
Guadalupian first appearances
Lopingian extinctions
Prehistoric therapsid families